The Last Stand is the third studio album by the American hip hop collective Boot Camp Clik. It was released in 2006 through Duck Down Music. The production was handled by 9th Wonder, Marco Polo, Da Beatminerz, Coptic, Illmind, Ken Ring, Large Professor, Pete Rock, Rune Rotter and Sic Beats. The album marked the return of the original 1997 group lineup.

Critical reception
XXL called the album "lush with pounding production and dense similes."

AllMusic wrote: "Awash in slow and mid-tempo tracks emblazoned with the dusty, cut-up R&B samples of NYC's '90s heyday, Boot Camp rolls thick through piano drops and sparely framed tracks, rapping about money, women, and street pride."

Track listing

Charts

References

External links

2006 albums
Boot Camp Clik albums
Duck Down Music albums
Albums produced by Illmind
Albums produced by Pete Rock
Albums produced by 9th Wonder
Albums produced by Marco Polo
Albums produced by Da Beatminerz
Albums produced by Large Professor